The Mesoregion of Araraquara is one of the 15 mesoregions of the São Paulo state, Brazil. It is located on the center of the state, and has an area of 9,451.2 km².

The population of the mesoregion is 810,926 inhabitants (IBGE/2010), spread over 21 municipalities.

Municipalities
All data from IBGE/2010

Microregion of Araraquara

Population: 502,149
Area (km²): 6,265.8
Population density (km²): 80.14

Américo Brasiliense, Araraquara, Boa Esperança do Sul, Borborema, Dobrada, Gavião Peixoto, Ibitinga, Itápolis, Matão, Motuca, Nova Europa, Rincão, Santa Lúcia, Tabatinga, Trabiju

Microregion of São Carlos

Population: 308,777
Area (km²): 3,185.4
Population density (km²): 96.94

Analândia, Descalvado, Dourado, Ibaté, Ribeirão Bonito, São Carlos

References

Ara